La Colorada is a corregimiento in Santiago District, Veraguas Province, Panama with a population of 2,128 as of 2010. Its population as of 1990 was 1,974; its population as of 2000 was 2,100.

References

Corregimientos of Veraguas Province